The Elmore County Public School System is a public school district serving most of Elmore County, Alabama.

Its headquarters are in Wetumpka. In addition to Wetumpka it includes the towns of Coosada, Deatsville, Eclectic, and Elmore, as well as the census designated places of Blue Ridge, Emerald Mountain, Holtville, and  Redland. It also includes Elmore County sections of Millbrook (vast majority of the municipality) and Prattville (a portion of the municipality).

History
A candidate for the Elmore County Board of Education quoted in an article in the Montgomery Advertiser argued that the county school system sufficiently meets the needs of the citizens of Millbrook, Alabama and that the school system lacked "local financial support" but did well academically.

The Southern Association of Colleges and Schools awarded accreditation to the district in 2008.

In 2020 there was a scandal regarding spending irregularities.

Schools

The district's 15 schools have over 10,000 students.

High schools
9–12 Traditional
 Elmore County High School (Eclectic)
 Holtville High School (unincorporated area, near Deatsville)
 Stanhope Elmore High School (Millbrook)
 Wetumpka High School (Wetumpka)

Middle schools
5–8
 Eclectic Middle School (Eclectic)
 Holtville Middle School (unincorporated area, near Deatsville)
 Millbrook Middle School (Millbrook)
 Wetumpka Middle School (Wetumpka)
 Formed by a merger of Wetumpka Intermediate School and Wetumpka Junior High School.

Elementary schools
K–6
 Redland Elementary School (Redland, unincorporated area, near Wetumpka)
 The school was scheduled to open in the northern hemisphere fall of 2009.
K–4
 Eclectic Elementary School (Eclectic)
 Holtville Elementary School (unincorporated area, near Deatsville)
 Wetumpka Elementary School (Wetumpka)
K—4
 Airport Road Intermediate School (Coosada)
 The school was scheduled to open in the northern hemisphere fall of 2009.
K–2
 Coosada Elementary School (Millbrook, near Coosada)

References

External links

 

School districts in Alabama
Education in Elmore County, Alabama